is a city located in Gifu, Japan. , the city had an estimated population of 27,356 in 10,868 households, and a population density of 120 persons per km2.

Geography
Yamagata is located in south-west Gifu Prefecture, north of the prefectural capital of Gifu city.

Climate
The city has a climate characterized by hot and humid summers, and mild winters (Köppen climate classification Cfa).  The average annual temperature in Yamagata is 15.2 °C. The average annual rainfall is 2086 mm with September as the wettest month. The temperatures are highest on average in August, at around 27.9 °C, and lowest in January, at around 3.7 °C.

Neighbouring municipalities
Gifu Prefecture
 Gifu
 Motosu
 Seki

Demographics
Per Japanese census data, the population of Yamagata peaked around 1990 and has declined since.

History
The area around Yamagata was part of traditional Mino Province.  The name, "Yamagata", can be found in Nara period records, and is thus one of the oldest place names in Japan. During the Edo period, much of the area was tenryō territory under the direct control of the Tokugawa shogunate. In the post-Meiji restoration cadastral reforms, Yamagata District in Gifu prefecture was created. The village of Takatomi was established on July 1, 1889 with the establishment of the modern municipalities system, and was raised to town status on March 19, 1897.

Takatomi and  the town of Miyama and village of Ijira (all from Yamagata District) merged to form the city of Yamagata on April 1, 2003.

Government
Yamagata has a mayor-council form of government with a directly elected mayor and a unicameral city legislature of 14 members.

Economy
Yamagata was traditionally known for its textile industry, and for the production of wooden bobbins for use in textile looms.

Education
Yamagata has nine public elementary schools and three public middle schools operated by the city government. The city has one public high school operated by the Gifu Prefectural Board of Education.

Transportation

Railway
The city does not have any passenger rail service.

Highway
 Tōkai-Kanjō Expressway

Sister city relations
 Florence, Oregon, United States Friendship City.

References

External links

  

 
Cities in Gifu Prefecture